Tales from the Dark 1 (李碧華鬼魅系列: 迷離夜) is a 2013 Hong Kong portmanteau horror film directed by Simon Yam, Lee Chi-ngai, and Fruit Chan. The film is split into three segments, each based on a short story by Lilian Lee. The first part, titled Stolen Goods (贓物), starred Simon Yam as a jobless man who steals funerary urns and forces the dead's relatives to pay him to get back the urns. The second part, titled A Word in the Palm (放手), starred Tony Leung Ka-fai as a fortune-teller who teams up with his neighbour (Kelly Chen) to help the ghost of a schoolgirl (Cherry Ngan). The final part, titled Jing Zhe (驚蟄), starred Susan Shaw as a "villain-hitter" who is approached by a woman (Dada Chan) to curse four people.

The first segment also marked the directorial debut of actor Simon Yam. The film was shown at the New York Asian Film Festival on 28 June 2013 and released theatrically in Hong Kong on 11 July 2013. It was followed by Tales from the Dark 2, which was released four weeks later on 8 August 2013.

Plot 
Stolen Goods
Kwan, an odd-job worker who lives in a "coffin home", gets fired from his job as a restaurant assistant. Out of desperation to pay rent, he breaks into a columbarium at night and randomly steals funerary urns, leaving behind ransom notes for the relatives to contact and pay him to get back the urns. On one occasion, he successfully collects ransom from the cousin of one of his "victims", who turns out to be the ghost of the "victim" himself. The money he received also turns into hell banknotes. Shocked, Kwan tries to burn the hell banknotes but the fire gets out of control and he burns himself to death.

A Word in the Palm
Ho, a fortune-teller who can see ghosts, is retiring from his trade to spend more time with his wife and son. His last clients are Cheung, a swimming coach, and Cheung's pregnant wife, who claims she is being haunted by a ghost. Ho teams up his neighbour Lan, a crystal seller and fellow fortune-teller, to unravel the mystery. It turns out that Cheung had an affair with his student, Chan Siu-ting, and made her pregnant. After Cheung scorned her, Chan drowned herself at sea and became a vengeful ghost. Ho and Lan manage to convince Chan's ghost to give up her desire for revenge and find peace in the afterlife. Ho later learns that his son has inherited his ability to see ghosts.

Jing Zhe
Chu is a "villain-hitter" who chants curses and hits paper effigies of people for a fee during the jing zhe period. Her customers come to her with the names, photographs, personal belongings, etc. of people they want to curse. She meets all sorts of customers, including a wealthy woman who has a grudge against her daughter-in-law and others, and a man with a similar-sounding name as the Hong Kong Chief Executive's. Her last customer, a young woman, says she wants three men and a woman cursed and she wants to do the hitting herself. Chu soon realises that she is the ghost of a woman raped and murdered by three men, of whom one is Chu's son. That day, Chu had witnessed her son and his two accomplices kidnapping the woman into a car but had turned a deaf ear to the woman's cries for help. The four of them meet their ends as the hitting intensifies.

Cast 

Stolen Goods
 Simon Yam as Kwan Fu-keung
 Yuen Qiu as the restaurant owner
 Felix Lok as Chu Wing-kit
 Maggie Shiu as Kwok Wing-nei
 Lam Suet as the eating ghost
 Jonathan Wong as a policeman
 Ariel and Audrey Chan as the ghost girls

A Word in the Palm
 Tony Leung Ka-fai as Ho Ho
 Kelly Chen as Lan
 Eileen Tung as Ho's wife
 Cherry Ngan as Chan Siu-ting
 Eddie Li as Cheung Ka-chun
 Jeannie Chan as Cheung's wife

Jing Zhe
Susan Shaw as Chu
Josephine Koo as Koo
Dada Chan as the ghost
Lo Hoi-pang as Leung Chun-ying
Sir JBS, Kit Leung and Phat Chan as the three men

Production and style
The film's story was adapted from the second book in Lilian Lee's five-volume book series that were originally published in newspaper form. The film's directors included Fruit Chan and Lee Chi-ngai who have not directed many films in the past decade and Simon Yam who made his directorial debut with this film.

Derek Elley of Film Business Asia described the film as a "portmanteau horror film" and felt it was similar in tone and style to 1980s and early 1990s Hong Kong horror films. The Hollywood Reporter echoed this statement, referring to it as a "film that harkens back to the glory days of Hong Kong horror in the 1980s."

Release
Tales from the Dark 1 was the opening night film at the New York Asian Film Festival on 28 June 2013. It was released theatrically in Hong Kong on 11 July 2013. The film was followed by a sequel titled Tales from the Dark 2, was released four weeks later on 8 August 2013.

Reception
Variety gave the film a mixed review, stating that "this somewhat uneven but engrossing mini-triptych should please fans of Asian horror without necessarily scaring their pants off". The Hollywood Reporter referred to the film as a "mostly engaging film"  and that "Anthologies are by definition hit and miss endeavors and often swing wildly in quality from one segment to the next. That’s exactly what happens here, except the producers have wisely managed to bottom load the film so that sitting through the first entry eventually pays off."

Notes

External links
 

2013 horror films
Hong Kong supernatural horror films
Horror anthology films
2013 films
Hong Kong ghost films
Films directed by Fruit Chan
Films set in Hong Kong
Films shot in Hong Kong
2013 directorial debut films
Films with screenplays by Lilian Lee
2010s Hong Kong films